Tangos Are for Two is a 1998 Spanish-Argentine drama film directed by Jaime Chávarri which stars Darío Grandinetti, Aitana Sánchez-Gijón and Juan Echanove.

Plot 
A Spanish couturier immigrates to Buenos Aires in the 1930s seeking to meet Carlos Gardel. There she meets Renzo, a look-alike of the latter.

Cast

Production 
A Spanish-Argentine co-production the film was produced by Rocabruno, Aurum Producciones and Patagonik Film Group. The screenplay was penned by Raúl Brambilla, Óscar Plasencia whereas Rodolfo Mederos,  and Daniel Berardi were responsible for the music.  took over cinematography duties.

Release 
The film was theatrically released in Spain on 23 January 1998.

Reception 
Augusto Martínez Torres of El País deemed the film to be an "excellent musical" whose "great appeal lies in the skill with which Chávarri has managed to integrate 14 tangos into an intense and dramatic love" story.

The review in La Nación assessed the film to be "very good", considering that the director "masterfully handled this kind of complicit fable" (...) "springing from simple everyday things".

Accolades 

|-
| rowspan = "2" align = "center" | 1999 || rowspan = "2" | 47th Silver Condor Awards || Best Actor || Darío Grandinetti ||  || rowspan = "2" | 
|-
| Best Original Screenplay || Oscar Plasencia, Raúl Brambilla ||  
|}

See also 
 List of Argentine films of 1998
 List of Spanish films of 1998

References 

Spanish drama films
Argentine drama films
1998 drama films
1990s musical drama films
1990s Spanish-language films
Films directed by Jaime Chávarri
1990s Spanish films